The National University of the Arts, in Spanish: UNA - Universidad Nacional de las Artes, formerly known as IUNA - Instituto Universitario Nacional de las Artes, is an Argentine university established in 1996 as an incorporation of various national institutions dedicated to the teaching of fine arts.

The origins of the current UNA University lay in the 1875 founding of the National Society of the Stimulus of the Arts by painters Eduardo Schiaffino, Eduardo Sívori, and others. Their guild was rechartered as the National Academy of Fine Arts in 1905 and, in 1923, on the initiative of painter and academic Ernesto de la Cárcova, as a department in the University of Buenos Aires, the Superior Art School of the Nation.

The latter in 1927 created the Museum of Reproductions and Comparative Sculpture. In 1936 theatre director Antonio Cunill Cabanellas founded the National Institute of Theatrical Studies. These institutions of Performing Arts, including the Carlos López Buchardo National Conservatory of Music, the National Institute of Superior Education and Folklore, the María Ruanova National Institute of Superior Education and Dance, and the National Institutes of Liberal Arts Education, all united forming the new National University of the Arts, "Universidad Nacional de las Artes", issued in 1996 by Argentina's Ministry of Education.

Departments

 Audiovisual Arts (http://audiovisuales.una.edu.ar/)
 Dramatic Arts (http://dramaticas.una.edu.ar/)
 Kinetic Arts (http://movimiento.una.edu.ar/)
 Music (https://musicalesysonoras.una.edu.ar/)
 Visual Arts (http://visuales.una.edu.ar/)
 Art Criticism (http://criticadeartes.una.edu.ar/)
 Folklore (http://folklore.una.edu.ar/)
 Educators Program (http://formaciondocente.una.edu.ar/)
 Multimedia (http://multimedia.una.edu.ar/)
 Writing Arts (http://artesdelaescritura.una.edu.ar/)
 The Ernesto de la Cárcova Museum of Reproductions and Comparative Sculpture (http://carcova.una.edu.ar/)

Notable alumni
Eduardo Arnosi, music critic, radio personality, and writer on music

See also
 List of Argentine universities

References

External links
Official website 

Argentine national universities
Art schools in Argentina
Arts schools in Argentina
Education in Buenos Aires
Educational institutions established in 1996
Universidad Nacional de las Artes
Universities in Buenos Aires Province
1996 establishments in Argentina